Verka Aleksieva (born 24 September 1943) is a Bulgarian rower. She competed in the women's quadruple sculls event at the 1976 Summer Olympics.

References

External links
 

1943 births
Living people
Bulgarian female rowers
Olympic rowers of Bulgaria
Rowers at the 1976 Summer Olympics
Place of birth missing (living people)